Dighi (Prarthana Fardin Dighi) is a Bangladeshi film actress and model.

Dighi may also refer to the following places:

Dighi Union, a union council in Manikganj District, Bangladesh
Dighi Port, in Agardanda, Maharashtra, India

See also

Digi (disambiguation)
Dibar Dighi, a reservoir in Bangladesh
Ghayebi Dighi Mosque, in Barothakuri Union, Zakiganj Upazila, Sylhet District, Bangladesh.
Laldighi Mosque, in Rangpur District, Bangladesh 
Lal Dighi, Chittagong, a body of water in Chittagong, Bangladesh